Tu Mera 22 Main Tera 22 (English translation: You're my brother & I'm your brother) is a Punjabi comedy film directed by Amit Prasher. The film features Amrinder Gill and Yo Yo Honey Singh in the lead roles as two spoiled rich brothers, alongside Mandy Takhar.
The film released on 25 January 2013, and did good business at the box office, completing verdict of "semi-hit".

Plot
The story unfolds in Melbourne with two spoiled rich brothers and best friends Robby (Amrinder Gill), and Rolly (Honey Singh). Their businessman father is worried about the future of his irresponsible sons so he strikes a deal with them, by throwing the brats out of his house and sending them to Punjab so that they can understand the realities of life and importance of their roots and heritage. The film is about how these two spoiled brothers arrive in Punjab and learn to live with the struggle, whilst being challenged by their father to come up with Rs. 3 million in 30 days in order to inherit his wealth. Otherwise the wealth would be transferred to charity which would be maintained by their father's secretary.

Cast
Mazhar Hussain Mangnejo as Hussain Khan
 Amrinder Gill as Robby
 Yo Yo Honey Singh as Rolly
 Mandy Takhar as Simmy
 Wamiqa Gabbi as Mini
 Raghveer boli as Raju
 Binnu Dhillon as Sher Singh
 Mukesh Vohra as Pinku
 Shavinder Mahal
 B.N. Sharma

Soundtrack
Music of this movie was released on 15 December 2012

Track list

Reception
Ballewood.in has given 4 (out of 5) stars to the movie saying, that the movie is meant for those who are looking for non-stop entertainment and heavy doses of laughter. "Tu Mera 22 Main Tera 22 is a winner all the way. A sure-shot Hit." Ballewood.in has also praised the director Amit Prasher for presenting a comedy in a sensible way.

Punjabiportal.com gave the film an above average rating of 35 out of 45. According to them, the film "is good and it will do fine on box office as well, but the complaint is that if they had done it better, it had all the ingredients of making into a huge hit of 2013." Supporting act of Binnu Dhillon has been praised once again, so much so that "the lead cast has to be the lead cast, but in Tu Mera 22, the supporting cast is overshadowing the lead."

According to updatesguru.
1st Day, 2nd Day and 3rd Day Box Office Collection of Tu Mera 22 Main Tera 22.
First Day (Friday) Collection of Tu Mera 22 Main Tera 22:- Rs 3.6 million
Second Day (Saturday) Collection of Tu Mera 22 Main Tera 22:- Rs 4.8 million
Third Day (Sunday) Collection of Tu Mera 22 Main Tera 22 :- 5.5 million (Est.)

2014 PTC Punjabi Film Awards

Tu Mera 22 Main Tera 22 won two Awards at the PTC Punjabi Film Awards in 2014.

References

2013 films
Films set in Melbourne
Punjabi-language Indian films
2010s Punjabi-language films